Penystrywad is a village near Llandinam in Powys, central Wales, between Newtown and Llanidloes, located on the A470.

Villages in Powys